Patrick Bismuth (born 15 December 1954) is a French classical violinist and conductor.

Biography 
Bismuth studied the violin with Roland Charmy at the Conservatoire de Paris.

From 1993 to 1998, Bismuth was teacher of baroque violin at the Conservatoire de Paris and is currently teacher at the Versailles, Boulogne Billancourt, Paris and Reims conservatories. Learning the baroque violin allows him to interpret differently classical, romantic and contemporary repertoires.

He has performed in numerous concerts with his ensemble "La Tempesta" and the Atlantis Quartet, of which he is co-founder and also with the organist Louis Thiry, who opened up the horizon of early music to him. He has been involved for many years in Jean-Claude Malgoire's ensembles.

He has recorded Bach's Sonatas and Partitas for Solo Violin, Heinrich Biber's Rosary Sonatas and sonatas by Jean-Marie Leclair, but also works by Ravel, Kreisler and Enesco. Under the title "Musique dans la cité interdite" he took part with the "Ensemble XVIII-21" of flutist Jean-Christophe Frisch, to the recording of music from the imperial court of China in the 18th century, and also pieces by Teodorico Pedrini and Joseph-Marie Amiot.

In 2011, with the organist Louis Thiry, he recorded Tientos by Francisco Correa de Arauxo, playing the violin, the viola and the viola da spalla.

References

External links 
 Official website of La Tempest ensemble
 Ensemble La Tempesta, Patrick Bismuth, direction
 Discography (Discogs)
 J.S. Bach - Sonatas & Partitas for Solo Violin, BWV 1001~1006 - Patrick Bismuth, Baroque Violin (Youtube)

20th-century French male classical violinists
French male conductors (music)
Conservatoire de Paris alumni
Academic staff of the Conservatoire de Paris
1954 births
Living people
21st-century French conductors (music)
21st-century French male classical violinists